The Lignites de Soissonais is a geologic formation in the Var, Marne departments of France. It preserves fossils dating back to the Ypresian stage of the Eocene period.

Fossil content 
The following fossils have been reported from the formation:

Reptiles 
Turtles

 Axestemys vittata
 Francellia salouagmirae
 Merovemys ploegi
 Neochelys arenarum
 N. eocaenica
 Allaeochelys sp.
 Palaeochelys sp.
 Trionyx sp.

Lizards

 Dormaalisaurus girardoti
 Geiseltaliellus longicaudus
 Tinosaurus europeocaenus
 Eolacerta sp.
 Necrosaurus sp.
 Tinosaurus sp.
 Amphisbaenidae indet.
 Anguini indet.
 Helodermatidae indet.
 Gekkonidae indet.
 Melanosaurini indet.

Snakes

 Calamagras gallicus
 Dunnophis matronensis
 Saniwa orsmaelensis
 Anniealexandria sp.

Mammals 
Primates

 Arcius fuscus
 A. lapparenti
 Avenius amatorum
 Cantius savagei
 Donrussellia provincialis
 Phenacolemur lapparenti
 Platychoerops daubrei
 Plesiadapis aff. remensis
 Pelycodus aff. eppsi
 Toliapina lawsoni
 T. vinealis
 cf. Agerinia sp.
 Adapidae indet.

Artiodactyls

 Bunophorus cappettai
 Diacodexis gazini
 D. varleti
 Cuisitherium sp.
 ?Diacodexis sp.
 ?Simpsonodus sp.

Carnivora

 Miacidae indet.
 ?Miacidae indet.

Cimolesta

 Plesiesthonyx luciae
 P. minimus
 cf. Hyracolestes sp.
 Palaeoryctidae indet.

Ferae

 Palaeonictis gigantea
 Quercygale smithi
 Uintacyon hookeri
 cf. Viverravus sp.

Hyaenodonta

 Didelphodus cf. absarokae
 Eoproviverra eisenmanni
 Galecyon gallus
 Minimovellentodon russelli
 Morlodon vellerei
 Preregidens cf. langebadrae
 Prototomus girardoti
 cf. Didelphodus sp.

Insectivora

 Apatemys mutiniacus
 A. sigogneaui
 Apatemys sp.
 Heterohyus sp.

Macroscelidea

 Neomatronella luciannae
 Macrocranion cf. nitens

Microchiroptera

 Ageina tobieni
 Icaronycteris menui

Microchiropteramorpha

 Archaeonycteris brailloni
 cf. Ageina sp.
 cf. Archaeonycteris sp.

Multituberculata
 Ectypodus riansensis

Perissodactyls

 Cymbalophus cuniculus
 Hyracotherium aff. leporinum
 Paschatherium russelli
 P. cf. dolloi
 ?Paschatherium sp.
 Pliolophus vulpiceps
 Teilhardimys musculus

Placentalia

 Hyopsodus itinerans
 Phenacodus cf. teilhardi
 cf. Paroxyclaenus sp.
 Phenacodus sp.

Rodents

 Microparamys cf. chandoni
 Pantrogna russelli
 Paramys cf. pourcyensis
 ?Ailuravinae indet.

Soricomorpha

 Placentidens lotus
 cf. Leptacodon sp.

Theriiformes

 Amphiperatherium aff. brabantense
 A. goethei
 A. cf. maximum
 Peradectes louisi
 Peratherium matronense
 ?Leptictidae indet.
 ?Nyctitheriidae indet.
 cf. Paroxyclaenidae indet.

See also 
 List of fossiliferous stratigraphic units in France
 Ypresian formations
 Ieper Group of Belgium
 Fur Formation of Denmark
 London Clay Formation of England
 Silveirinha Formation of Portugal
 Wasatchian formations
 Nanjemoy Formation of the eastern United States
 Wasatch Formation of the western United States
 Itaboraian formations
 Itaboraí Formation of Brazil
 Laguna del Hunco Formation of Argentina

References

Bibliography 

 
 
 
 
 
 
 
 
 
 
 
 
 
 
 
 
 
 
 
 
 
 
 
 
 
 
 

Geologic formations of France
Paleogene France
Eocene Series of Europe
Ypresian Stage
Coal formations
Fossiliferous stratigraphic units of Europe
Paleontology in France
Formations
Formations